Omphalotropis striatapila is a species of minute, salt marsh snail with an operculum, aquatic gastropod mollusks, or micromollusks, in the family Assimineidae. This species is endemic to Palau.

References
  

Fauna of Palau
Omphalotropis
Assimineidae
Endemic fauna of Palau
Gastropods described in 1897
Taxonomy articles created by Polbot